Nereducharla is a new municipality in Suryapet district of Telangana, India. It is located in Neredcherla mandal of Suryapet revenue division. It is about 38km from the district headquarters Suryapet.

References

Mandal headquarters in Suryapet district
Villages in Suryapet district